A9 is a highway under construction which is planned to connect Nicosia, the capital of Cyprus, with the Troödos Mountains.  Currently this highway is completed until the small village of Dhenia. The project has stopped until the safety of planners will be established.  Although, approach towards Troödos from Astromeritis is under planning, with Evrychou, a small village near Kakopetria to be the temporary ending junction.

Commencement on the A9 highway to Troödos was expected in early 2012.  The highway planning has been split into 3 sections or phases, with phase 1 completed in 2006.  Phase 2 will see the highway span from Dhenia to Astromeritis and phase 3, culminating in the termination of the motorway at a large roundabout on the border of Evrychou.  The roundabout will provide access to the B9 road (towards Kakopetria and Troödos), link access to the village of Flasou.

The A9 highway is not expected to be completed before 2016.

See also 
 A1 motorway (Cyprus)
 A2 motorway (Cyprus)
 A3 motorway (Cyprus)
 A4 motorway (Cyprus)
 A5 motorway (Cyprus)
 A6 motorway (Cyprus)
 A7 motorway (Cyprus)
 A22 motorway (Cyprus)

References 

Motorways and roads in Cyprus
Proposed roads
Proposed transport infrastructure in Cyprus